Tillandsia araujei is a flowering plant species in the genus Tillandsia. This species is endemic to Brazil.

Further reading

araujei
Flora of Brazil